3F or 3-F may refer to:

 Fédération Française de Football (French Football Federation), the governing body of football in France
 Fagligt Fælles Forbund
 Fangio, Farina, Fagioli - drivers of the Alfa Romeo factory team
 3 Fonteinen - Belgian brewery, specializing in gueuze and kriek
 0x3F, ASCII code for question mark
 Tres de Febrero Partido, Buenos Aires Province, Argentina

See also
F3 (disambiguation)